Opilidia is a genus of beetles in the family Cicindelidae, containing the following species:

 Opilidia chlorocephala (Chevrolat, 1834)
 Opilidia fulgidiceps (Putzeys, 1845)
 Opilidia graphiptera (Dejean, 1831)
 Opilidia leuconoe (Bates, 1890)
 Opilidia macrocnema (Chaudoir, 1852)
 Opilidia pilosipes (W. Horn, 1925)

References

Cicindelidae